The 2015 BWF World Championships was a badminton tournament which was held from 10 to 16 August 2015 in Jakarta, Indonesia.

Host city selection
Jakarta and Kunshan submitted bids to host the championships. Jakarta was awarded to host the event by Badminton World Federation after winning by 1 vote difference.

Draw
The draw was held on 28 July 2015 at 11:00 local time at the Museum Bank Indonesia in Jakarta, Indonesia.

Schedule
All five events started on the first day and concluded with the final on the last day.

All times are local (UTC+7).

Medalists

Medal table

References

External links
Official website
tournamentsoftware

 
2015
World Championships
BWF World Championships
2015 BWF World Championships
2015 BWF World Championships
2015 BWF World Championships